Myriopteris longipila, formerly known as Cheilanthes longipila, is a species of fern native to Mexico. It is characterized by a dense covering of long whitish hairs.

Description

Etymology

Taxonomy
The species was originally described as Cheilanthes longipila by John Gilbert Baker in 1891. His description was based on the specimen Charles Christopher Parry & Edward Palmer 989, collected by those two botanists in Central Mexico. He noted that it was similar to Cheilanthes viscosa, but bore long, soft hairs without glands (presumably the source of the epithet "longipila"), and had a leaf blade widest near the middle rather than at the base.

In 2004, John Mickel described a new variety of the species, Cheilanthes longipila var. brevipila, based on Soto 1052, a specimen collected near Amatitlán, . In this variety, the pinnae are mostly alternate rather than opposite, and the hairs are shorter and more variable in character than in typical material of the species.

The development of molecular phylogenetic methods showed that the traditional circumscription of Cheilanthes is polyphyletic. Convergent evolution in arid environments is thought to be responsible for widespread homoplasy in the morphological characters traditionally used to classify it and the segregate genera that have sometimes been recognized. On the basis of molecular evidence, Amanda Grusz and Michael D. Windham revived the genus Myriopteris in 2013 for a group of species formerly placed in Cheilanthes. One of these was C. longipila, which thus became Myriopteris longipila. They recognized and transferred Mickel's variety as well, so that the species is now divided into two varieties, the typical M. longipila var. longipila and M. longipila var. brevipila. In 2018, Maarten J. M. Christenhusz transferred the species to Hemionitis as H. gracillima, as part of a program to consolidate the cheilanthoid ferns into that genus.

Further molecular studies in Myriopteris demonstrated the existence of three well-supported clades within the genus. M. longipila is nested in one of them, informally named the lanosa clade by Grusz et al., where it forms the sister clade to Myriopteris lanosa. The lanosa clade is distinguished from all other species of the genus, except M. wrightii, by forming fiddleheads as leaves emerge.

Distribution and habitat

Notes and references

References

Works cited

longipila
Flora of Mexico